Bronte May Law (born 12 March 1995) is an English professional golfer. Her maiden LPGA Tour victory, her first win as a professional, came in May 2019 at the Pure Silk Championship in Virginia.  Her second professional victory occurred in October 2021 in Dubai; this was her first win on the Ladies European Tour.

Early life and amateur career
Law was born in Stockport and attended Cheadle Hulme School and the University of California, Los Angeles (UCLA).

Law played for Great Britain & Ireland in the 2012, 2014 and 2016 Curtis Cup matches. In 2016, she became the second player, and the first from Great Britain and Ireland, to get a perfect 5–0 record. Also in 2016 she won the European Ladies Amateur Championship, becoming the world number 2 ranked player in the World Amateur Golf Ranking.

Professional career
Law turned professional late in 2016. She competed in the LPGA Final Qualifying Tournament, earning full status on the Symetra Tour and partial status on the LPGA Tour for 2017.

In early May 2019, Law lost to Kim Sei-young in a playoff for the LPGA Mediheal Championship. Three weeks later she won the Pure Silk Championship for her first victory on the LPGA Tour.

Personal life 
Law is the daughter of Morven and Timothy Law. She has a younger sister named Isabella. Law studied sociology at UCLA, where she met one of her best friends, teammate Alison Lee. The two have each led solid careers early on the LPGA Tour. She grew up an avid competitor in all sports, and is a big football fan, holding allegiances to Manchester United.

Amateur wins
2013 Nanea Pac-12 Preview
2014 Stanford Intercollegiate, English Women's Amateur Championship
2015 Northrop Grumman Regional Challenge, English Women's Amateur Championship, Stanford Intercollegiate
2016 PING ASU Invitational, NCAA Bryan Regional, European Ladies Amateur Championship, Stanford Intercollegiate

Source:

Professional wins (3)

LPGA Tour wins (1)

LPGA Tour playoff record (0–1)

Ladies European Tour wins (2)

Results in LPGA majors
Results not in chronological order before 2019.

^ The Evian Championship was added as a major in 2013

CUT = missed the half-way cut
NT = no tournament
T = tied

Summary

Most consecutive cuts made – 5 (2017 Evian – 2018 Evian)
Longest streak of top-10s – 1

Team appearances
Amateur
European Girls' Team Championship (representing the England): 2011, 2012
Junior Vagliano Trophy: (representing Great Britain & Ireland): 2011
Curtis Cup (representing Great Britain & Ireland): 2012 (winners), 2014, 2016 (winners)
Junior Ryder Cup (representing Europe): 2012
European Ladies' Team Championship (representing England): 2013, 2014, 2015, 2016 (winners)
Vagliano Trophy (representing Great Britain and Ireland): 2013, 2015
Junior Solheim Cup (representing Europe): 2013
Espirito Santo Trophy (representing England): 2014
Astor Trophy (representing Great Britain and Ireland): 2015

Source:

Professional
International Crown (representing England): 2018
Solheim Cup (representing Europe): 2019 (winners)

Solheim Cup record

References

External links

English female golfers
UCLA Bruins women's golfers
Ladies European Tour golfers
LPGA Tour golfers
Sportspeople from Stockport
1995 births
Living people
20th-century English women
21st-century English women